The Nutrecul Agroforestry Project is a project which promotes the use of the indigenous multipurpose tree species Treculia africana. This project was initiated by Belgian agronomists and missionaries in the rainforest of the Democratic Republic of the Congo; and later entrusted to the Belgian horticulturist Jean Kiala-Inkisi. The project promotes Forestry combined with alternative food provision through agro-forestry techniques.

Prehistory

Eala, 1924 - INEAC, 1930-1962
The botanists P. Staner & A. Corbisier together with Professor G. Gilbert at the Laboratory of Tropical Forestry, UC Louvain-la-Neuve Belgium started cultivating the Treculia at the Botanic Garden of Eala in the Belgian Congo at the end of 1924. During the period from 1930 to 1962, research was conducted at The National Institute for Agronomy in the Belgian Congo (Institut National pour l'Etude Agronomique du Congo Belge or INEAC).

Lisala, 1974-1977
During the years 1974, 1976 and 1977, the Flemish Father Jacques Bijttebier of the Scheut Missionaries had the opportunity to live for many months in the area of the Catholic Mission of Lokalema (Zaïre), and more particularly in the Pygmy villages situated downriver on the Zaire,(Congo), facing Lisala. He was able to gather there a lot of original information regarding the Treculia. For more than 30 years he studied and selected, together with the Flemish Sister Paula Trio, the best varieties of the Treculia in Pendjua in the north of Bandundu Province, Democratic Republic of the Congo. In 1974 Father Jaqcues Bijttebier, (under the guidance of the Food and Agriculture Organization of the United Nations (FAO) and UNESCO), mapped the dissemination area of the Treculia in Africa.

Kisangani - Belgium, 1974-1993

During the period from 1974 to 1993 Father Jaqcues Bijttebier worked closely with;

 Prof. L.O.J. De Wilde, Section Tropical Regions, the Faculty of Agronomy R.U.Gent
 Rev. Father G. Nollet, Missionary of Scheut
 Rev. Father P. Van Den Bosch, Missionary of Scheut
 Rev. Father Dr. G. Noë, the Society of Jesus
 The Ministry of Cooperation for Development (Belgium)
 Dr. Sc. E.L. Adriaens, the Ministry of Agriculture (Belgium)
 Ir. F.-X. Buysse, The Laboratory of the State Research Station for cattle-feeding at Melle-Gontrode (Belgium)
 Dr. Ir. J. Coosemans, Laboratory of Phytopathology and Plant Protection, K.U.Leuven
 Ir. R. De Lathouwer, the Laboratory of the A.S. Vandermoortele
 Prof. Dr. Ir. J. D’Hoore, the Laboratory of Soil-Genesis and Soil-Geography, K.U.Leuven
 Prof. G. Gilbert at the Laboratory of Tropical Forestry, U.C. Louvain-la-Neuve
 Prof. Dr. Ir. A. Pieters, Section Tropical Forestry of the Faculty of Agronomy of Lovanium (Zaïre)
 Dr. Sc. R. Remmerie, K.U.Leuven
 Prof. M. Vanbelle, The Laboratory of Biochemistry of Nutrition, U.C. Louvain-la-Neuve
 Dr. Ir. R. Van Droogenbroeck, K.U.Leuven

In 1978 Father Jaqcues Bijttebier wrote an article "Essais de panification avec des farines "non panifiables", about his bake tests using Treculia flour. In the 1980s Prof. Hugo Gevaerts was teaching at the Faculty of Science in Kisangani, where he met Prof. Jean DeClerck. He told Prof. Jean DeClerck about agro-breeding programs and the remaining work to do. While their contact was growing, they met Father Jaqcues Bijttebier, who talked about a tree that could be a solution to malnutrition. In 1992, Father Jacques Bijttebier published a paper in which he describes the properties and nutritional value of this plant. Father Jacques Bijttebier died, at the age of 66, on May 27, 1993 in Leuven (Belgium).

Kisangani - Belgium, 1993-1998
After Father Jaqcues Bijttebier died, Sister Paula Trio remained in contact with the coordinator Jean DeClerck. They learned that Sister Paula Trio would definitely leave Pendjua. Prof. Jean DeClerck requested that Treculia-seeds from the best varieties (still in pulp), be brought over with her on her last return trip from Belgium. (N.B the germination of the Treculia seeds is extremely short). Sister Paula Trio then brought +-400 seeds with her, which Prof. Jean DeClerck immediately divided amongst the involved Universities and also the Botanical National Garden of Meise (Belgium). These seeds were germinated fast and after six weeks became trees of +-15 cm. Prof. Jean Lejoly (Ulb) wanted to save 100 of them to undertake research participated in with Zairian, (Congolese), scientists, L. Ndjele & JP Mate. Prof. Hugo Gevaerts brought the 300 young trees he had left on his travel to Kisangani in 1995, where they immediately and carefully were planted at the University.

Appreciation for this plant as a fruit tree really started thanks to Project Rotary International "Project Agro-forestry 3-H", an initiative of Professors Jean DeClerck (formerly a visiting professor at the Faculty of Medicine at the University of Kisangani), Jean LeJoly, (Professor at the Université Libre de Bruxelles, Laboratoire de Botanique), and Hugo Gevaerts, (former dean of the Faculté des Sciences, UNIKIS and professor at the Limburg University Centre). These three professors have, together with their colleagues from the University of Kisangani, (Leopold Ndjele, Valentin Kamabu and Jean-Pierre Mate), been inspired by the important results of the work of Father Bijtebier to encourage that this tree be adopted by the population of Kisangani. This project, Agro-forestry 3-H, ran from 1995 to 1998. In this period several plantations were laid out and there were thousands of plants distributed to the population. Various wars of recent years have prevented the normal development of this project.

Fortunately, in 1998 the "Project LUC", (Limburg University Centre), led by Professor Hugo Gevaerts was created. This project devoted much attention to the popularization of this "miracle plant" under the Agro-forestry project.

Lubumbashi - Kinshasa, 2004
In 2004, the Foundation Maisha planted, in cooperation with researchers from the Universities of Kisangani and Leuven K.U.L (Belgium), the Treculia Africana tree in Lubumbashi to nourish the street children. Later also, the Université de Kinshasa planted trees on their University Campus.

History
From 2000 to 2003 the horticulturist Jean Kiala-Inkisi was taught by Romain Wiels, an agronomist and former colonial of the Congo. This wise man told in his practice lessons about his experiences in the Congo; and about the possible potential of these plants in the food and pharmaceutical industry. In the winter of 2012, nine years after his last classes with agronomist Romain Wiels, Jean Kiala-Inkisi came back in contact with his old teacher. While talking about his project, agronomist Romain Wiels told him about his old friend Prof. Jean DeClerck and the Treculia trees.

Sint-Pieters-Leeuw 2012
In the spring of 2012 the horticulturist Jean Kiala-Inkisi came in contact with the Flemish bakery consultant Guido Lasat, who was a close friend of Father Bijtebier who had worked with him in the '70s to early '90s. This man talked about the potential in the bakery industry and advocating starting a plantation. In 2012 the Belgian CICM Missionaries and the Flemish bakery consultant Guido Lasat entrusted to managing director Jean Kiala-Inkisi an old agro-forestry project of the late Father Jacques Bijttebier in the rainforest of the D.R. of the Congo. The idea being to create a network of agricultural cooperatives so that farmers can get a fair price for their crop. Guido Lasat died in March 2013.

Lisala - Kisangani 2012
In 2012, Jean Kiala-Inkisi did his research on the Treculia and selected the best varieties from Africa. On the advice of the Belgian Fathers, he collected many distinct plant cuttings and seeds, and placed them on tissue culture in five laboratories in Africa and Europe. Later destroyed the test fields in the forest, just to be sure no Western company would monopolize the project. He managed to collect 15 cultivars coming directly from Father Bijttebier’s testing fields. By the end of the year, the Nutrecul Agro-forestry Project was created. Nutrecul is a contraction of Nutrition Treculia or Nutritive Trees Cultivation.

Kisangani, 2014
Because director Jean Kiala-Inkisi received death threats from the Western Seed & Nutrition lobby. As of May 5, 2014, the project merged with the AWDF to ensure the development of the innovative tropical forest conservation project Nutrecul.

References

External links
Official website